The Bureya Range (Bureinskiy Khrebet) is a mountain range in the Khabarovsk Krai and Jewish Autonomous Oblast in the southern part of the Russian Far East.

The Dusse-Alin Tunnel on the Baikal Amur Mainline crosses the range to enter the Amgun River valley. The Bastak Nature Reserve, a protected area, is located in the southeastern corner of the range.

Geography
To the northeast it connects with the Badzhal Range. The range forms the drainage divide of the Bureya, Amgun and Urmi rivers. The sources of the Selemdzha River are located at the northern end, where other three ranges meet the Bureya mountain chain, the Dusse-Alin from the south, the Ezop Range from the west and the Yam-Alin from the north. The Dusse-Alin and Yam-Alin are a northern prolongation of the Bureya Range.

Mount Studencheskaya is located in the southern part of the Bureya Range. At , it is the highest point of the Jewish Autonomous Oblast.

Flora 
The slopes of the range are covered by conifer and deciduous forests.

See also
List of mountains and hills of Russia

References

External links
Brucite deposits of the lesser Khingan / southern Bureya range
Geochemical characteristics of precious metal-bearing carbonaceous sequences from the eastern Bureya Massif
Mountain ranges of Khabarovsk Krai
Landforms of the Jewish Autonomous Oblast